KCNI (1280 AM) is a radio station broadcasting a country music format. Licensed to Broken Bow, Nebraska, United States, the station is currently owned by Custer County Broadcasting Co. and features programming from Westwood One and NBC Radio.

Translators

References

External links

CNI
Country radio stations in the United States
Radio stations established in 1949
CNI
1949 establishments in Nebraska